The Lake Range is a mountain range located in western Nevada in the United States. It is entirely in Washoe County, and the southern two-thirds are in the Pyramid Lake Indian Reservation.

The range is situated between Pyramid Lake to the west and the dry Winnemucca Lake to the east. To the southeast is the Mud Lake Slough, which previously connected Pyramid Lake to Winnemucca Lake.  To the northwest is the San Emido Desert with the Fox Range beyond.  To the east, Winnemucca Lake separates the Lake Range from the Nightingale Mountains and the Selenite Range.  To the west, beyond Pyramid Lake are the Virginia and the Pah Rah ranges.

The named peaks of the Lake Range are (in order from north to south) Sweetwater Peak , Wildcat Peak , Tohakum Peak  and Pyramid Peak ).

The Lake Range is the site of the final skirmish of the second battle of the Pyramid Lake War.

References

Mountain ranges of Washoe County, Nevada
Mountain ranges of Nevada